Gianandrea Gavazzeni (25 July 19095 February 1996) was an Italian pianist, conductor (especially of opera), composer and musicologist.

Gavazzeni was born in Bergamo.  For almost 50 years, starting from 1948, he was principal conductor at La Scala, Milan, in 1966–68 being its music and artistic director.

He had his Metropolitan Opera debut on 11 October 1976.  He conducted eight performances of Giuseppe Verdi's Il trovatore that year at the Met.

His compositions include: concertos such as 'Concerto bergamasco'; 'The Song of St Alexander'; and sonatas.

His last wife was the soprano Denia Mazzola-Gavazzeni. In January 1993, at age 83, he conducted Jules Massenet's Esclarmonde at Teatro Massimo di Palermo, with his wife singing the title role.  It was the first time he had conducted this opera.

Gianandrea Gavazzeni died on 5 February 1996.

References

Biography of Gianandrea Gavazzeni
New York Times, Gavazzeni's death announcement

1909 births
1996 deaths
Musicians from Bergamo
Italian classical composers
Italian male classical composers
Italian male conductors (music)
Italian opera composers
Male opera composers
Italian classical pianists
Male classical pianists
Italian male pianists
20th-century classical composers
20th-century classical pianists
20th-century Italian composers
20th-century Italian musicologists
20th-century Italian conductors (music)
20th-century Italian male musicians